John "Jack" Elwyn Evans (1897 – 15 July 1941) was a Welsh rugby union and professional rugby league footballer who played in the 1920s. He played representative level rugby union (RU) for Wales, and at club level for Brynamman RFC, Amman United RFC, Swansea RFC, and Llanelli RFC as a wing, or centre, i.e. number 11 or 14, or 12 or 13, and club level rugby league (RL) for Broughton Rangers.

Background
Jack Elwyn Evans was born in Brynamman, Wales, and he died aged 43–44 in Denbigh, Wales.

International honours
Jack Evans won a cap for Wales (RU) while at Llanelli RFC in 1924 against Scotland.

References

External links
Search for "Evans" at rugbyleagueproject.org

Statistics at scrum.com
Statistics at wru.co.uk
Profile at swansearfc.co.uk

1897 births
1941 deaths
Broughton Rangers players
Footballers who switched code
Llanelli RFC players
People from Brynamman
Rugby league players from Carmarthenshire
Rugby union centres
Rugby union players from Carmarthenshire
Swansea RFC players
Wales international rugby union players
Welsh rugby league players
Welsh rugby union players